The 1925 Temple Owls football team was an American football team that represented Temple University as an independent during the 1925 college football season. In its first season under head coach Heinie Miller, the team compiled a 5–2–2 record. Center James Gilliand was the team captain.

Schedule

References

Temple
Temple Owls football seasons
Temple Owls football